Richfield Township, Ohio may refer to:
Richfield Township, Henry County, Ohio
Richfield Township, Lucas County, Ohio
Richfield Township, Summit County, Ohio

See also
Richland Township, Ohio (disambiguation)

Ohio township disambiguation pages